William Gifford or Jeffard (by 1489 – 1538 or later) was an English politician.

He was Mayor of Reading for 1511–12, 1520–21 and 1524–25, and elected a Member (MP) of the Parliament of England for Reading in 1512.

References

15th-century births
16th-century deaths
English MPs 1512–1514
Members of the Parliament of England (pre-1707) for Reading
Mayors of Reading, Berkshire